Ebony Rhapsody is an album by saxophonist Ricky Ford.

Recording and music
Ebony Rhapsody was recorded in concert at Birdland, New York City, on June 2, 1990 and released on CD by Candid Records. It is a quartet recording, with leader Ricky Ford (tenor sax) joined by Jaki Byard (piano), Milt Hinton (bass), and Ben Riley (drums). Five of the nine tracks are Ford originals.

Reception

The AllMusic review by Scott Yanow stated "Tenor-saxophonist Ricky Ford is in his usual swinging form on this live quartet date ... easily recommended to fans of the distinctive tenor and those who enjoy modern hard bop".
The Chicago Tribune reviewer commented that "Though there is nothing particularly musically distinctive about any of it, the recording is vivid and makes you wish you'd been there to hear it happen".

Track listing
All compositions by Ricky Ford except where noted
Introduction by Mark Morganelli - 0:34
"Ebony Rhapsody" (Franz Liszt) – 8:42
"Mon Amour" – 6:43
"Independence Blues" – 7:35
"Mirror Man" – 4:57
"In a Sentimental Mood" (Duke Ellington) – 4:40
"Setting Sun Blues" – 8:10
"Broadway" (Henri Woode) – 8:35
"Red, Crack and Blue" – 6:15

Personnel
Ricky Ford – tenor sax
Jaki Byard – piano
Milt Hinton – bass
Ben Riley – drums

References

1990 albums
Candid Records live albums
Ricky Ford live albums
Albums recorded at Birdland